—often misspelled  according to the pronunciation—is a Japanese brand of mayonnaise, and the name of the company that makes it. Kewpie is the best selling mayonnaise in Japan, and is also sold in other countries.

History

Nakajima Enterprises was founded in Tokyo in 1919 by Toichiro Nakashima. He had previously worked in the United States for three years as an intern for the Ministry of Agriculture and Commerce, where he first encountered mayonnaise and the Kewpie doll that became his emblem. Originally, his business distributed canned salmon.  Mayonnaise production began in 1925,  and it has been the best selling brand of mayonnaise in Japan ever since. The company is now called the Kewpie Corp. The company stopped production of mayonnaise during World War II because of supply shortages, and resumed production in 1948.

Nakashima's businesses are based on "innovation, consistent improvement, and building cooperative frameworks, while fulfilling social responsibilities that ring true even in today's society", according to a Japanese academic journal.

In 1998, the company was sued for US$7 million for trademark infringement by a Japanese businessman who had obtained the rights to the Kewpie doll in Japan. The company defended itself, saying that it had a trademark in Japan going back 73 years, and that the Kewpie character was in the public domain. The courts sided with the mayonnaise manufacturer.

In 2020, the company had sales of US$5 billion. The company also manufactures cosmetics and pharmaceuticals. Amane Nakashima is the current chairman of Kewpie Corp., and is also president of the affiliated Nakashimato Co., a food distribution company.

Ingredients and flavor

Kewpie is made of apple cider vinegar or rice vinegar and egg yolks, resulting in a "more custardy consistency" than typical American mayonnaises, many of which are made out of whole eggs. It also contains vegetable oil, monosodium glutamate, salt and spices.

A food writer with the Sacramento Bee wrote that "Kewpie’s irresistible flavor is different than other mayonnaises. After sweet, sour, salty and bitter, it is imbued with umami". The umami flavor component is the result of the monosodium glutamate. Comparing Kewpie to American mayonnaise, a food writer at the Los Angeles Times described the flavor: "The initial taste is mellower, creamier, even slightly fruity. The egginess is certainly stronger because of the yolk content, but it isn’t overpowering. There’s no added sugar, so it doesn’t have that cloying sweetness of a Miracle Whip." Its flavor is described as more "assertive" than common American brands. Mari Katsumura of the Michelin starred restaurant Yugen in Chicago compared Kewpie to U.S. market leader Hellmann's, concluding, "The acid is a bit higher, it's a little sweeter and the umami content is a little stronger, as well".

In 2017, the Chicago Tribune conducted a blind taste test of 13 brands of mayonnaise sold in the United States. Kewpie was the "clear winner", described as "way ahead of the pack". According to the newspaper  "The aroma was pleasantly eggy, the texture creamy. The eggy flavor was slightly tangy, with what one taster described as a 'very pronounced' umami element."

Common uses
 Tamago sando, an egg salad sandwich widely sold in convenience stores in Japan
 Potato salad
 Sushi
 Karaage, lightly coated pieces of marinated meat, usually chicken
 Takoyaki, battered and cooked balls of minced octopus
 Pizza topping
 Okonomiyaki, a savory pancake made of a flour batter, shredded cabbage and a variety of other ingredients
 Spicy mayonnaise, Kewpie blended with sriracha

Cultural impact

Kewpie fits into yōshoku (洋食 western food) -- a style of Western-influenced cooking popular in Japan. The packaging is described as kawaii or cute. Kewpie is described as a "cult favorite" in Japan. According to the Los Angeles Times, "It has transcended the plane of mere human consumption to become a cultural touchstone — a passion that can border on obsession." There is a Japanese word マヨラー (mayora) which means a person addicted to mayonnaise. The company operates a museum in Tokyo called Mayo Terrace.

International sales

Kewpie has sold its products in China since 1993, and operates three factories in China, located in Beijing, Hangzhou and Guangzhou. These plants can produce 72,000 tons of mayonnaise each year, and Kewpie is the dominant brand in several of China's largest cities. Southeast Asia is also a significant market. The company has sold its products in the United States since the early 1990s. It has a factory there that produces mayonnaise without monosodium glutamate, as well as other salad dressing and flavored sauces. Overseas sales accounted for about 9% of the company's business in 2019.

See also

 List of mayonnaises

References

Mayonnaise
Food manufacturers of Japan
1919 establishments in Japan
Food and drink companies based in Tokyo
Companies based in Tokyo